The Battle of Kazan may refer to the following:
 Various battles during Mongol invasion of Volga Bulgaria
 Siege of Kazan (1469), in the Russo-Kazan Wars
 Siege of Kazan (1487), in the Russo-Kazan Wars
 Siege of Kazan (1524), in the Russo-Kazan Wars
 Siege of Kazan (1552), the final battle of the Russo-Kazan Wars
 Battle of Kazan (1774) as a part of the Pugachev's Rebellion
 Battle of Kazan (1918) and its part Kazan Operation, Russian Civil War.